Jay Hickman (born May 23, 1973) is an American film and voice actor, best known for his prolific voice work on English language dubs of Japanese anime shows for ADV Films, Sentai Filmworks and Funimation.

Career

Hickman lent his voice to the character of Mark in the 2002 Canadian film Touching Wild Horses, starring Jane Seymour. He has also a number of on-screen appearances, including an uncredited bit part in the 1998 film Rushmore opposite television and movie actress Alexis Bledel and Apollo 11. In anime, he is known as the voice of Kurama from Elfen Lied, Kagetane Hiruko from Black Bullet, Crusty from the Log Horizon series and Ryuya from Air.

Filmography

Anime

Live-action roles

References

External links
 
 
 
 Jay Hickman at Crystal Acids
 

1973 births
Living people
American male voice actors
21st-century American singers
21st-century American male singers